is a railway station in Ōita City, Ōita Prefecture, Japan. It is operated by JR Kyushu and is on the Nippō Main Line. The station serves the Ōita suburb of Sakanoichi.

Lines

Layout 
The station consists of an island and a side platform serving three tracks at grade. Platforms/tracks 1 and 2 are located on the island while platform 3 is a side platform served by track 3 which is a siding. The station building, a modern structure completed in 2009, is located next to the tracks nearest track 1 and not in contact with any platform. It houses a waiting area, an automatic ticket vending machine, a SUGOCA card reader and a ticket window (which is, at present, not staffed). Access from the station building to the platforms is by means of a footbridge. Several sidings also run in between track 1 and the station building.

Adjacent stations

History
The Kyushu Railway was nationalised on 1 July 1907. Japanese Government Railways (JGR), designated the track as the Hōshū Main Line on 12 October 1909 and expanded it southwards in phases, with Kōzaki opening as the new southern terminus on 1 April 1914. On 15 December 1923, the Hōshū Main Line was renamed the Nippō Main Line. With the privatization of Japanese National Railways (JNR), the successor of JGR, on 1 April 1987, the station came under the control of JR Kyushu.

JR Kyushu stopped staffing Kōzaki in 2016 because of declining passenger traffic. However, on 17 March 2018, "Smart Support" facilities were added to the station. Under this scheme, although there would not be railway personnel in attendance, passengers could receive assistance via intercom from staff at a central support centre.

Passenger statistics
In fiscal 2015, there were a total of 127,334 boarding passengers, giving a daily average of 349 passengers.

See also
List of railway stations in Japan

References

External links 

Kōzaki (JR Kyushu)

Railway stations in Ōita Prefecture
Railway stations in Japan opened in 1914
Ōita (city)